Sandgate is a suburb of Newcastle, New South Wales, Australia, located  from Newcastle's central business district. It is part of the City of Newcastle local government area.

It has a railway station on the Hunter Line. Within the suburb is the largest cemetery in Newcastle, Sandgate Cemetery, which includes the now-derelict rail-head station, formerly used by funeral trains from Honeysuckle near Newcastle.

See also
 Sandgate Cemetery 
 Sandgate Flyover

References

Suburbs of Newcastle, New South Wales